Alcyone Cone is an extinct volcanic cone near the center of The Pleiades, at the west side of the head of Mariner Glacier in Victoria Land, Antarctica. Named by a Victoria University of Wellington Antarctic Expedition field party to Evans Neve, 1971–72, after Alcyone, the brightest star in the Pleiades constellation. The geographical landform is situated on the Pennell Coast, a portion of Antarctica lying between Cape Williams and Cape Adare.

References
 

Volcanoes of Victoria Land
Pennell Coast